Emirates SkyCargo is a cargo airline based in Dubai, United Arab Emirates. As of 2020, it is the fourth largest cargo airline worldwide in terms of the total freight tonne-kilometres flown and international freight tonne-kilometres flown.

Emirates SkyCargo is the air freight division of Emirates, which started operations in October 1985, the same year Emirates was formed. Since then, it has been the main cargo division of Emirates, and the anchor cargo airline at Al Maktoum International Airport, its main hub. Emirates SkyCargo operates dedicated cargo flights to 26 destinations from Al Maktoum International Airport, and through the Emirates passenger network has access to additional 61 destinations. Whilst using belly hold capacity in the Emirates' passenger fleet, it also operates freighter aircraft. Emirates SkyCargo is a subsidiary of The Emirates Group which has over 40,000 employees. Furthermore, it is wholly owned by the Government of Dubai directly under the Investment Corporation of Dubai.  The company slogan is, "Delivering the highest standards of product quality."

History

Early years
Emirates SkyCargo was established in October 1985, at the same time as Emirates was launched, operating as a separate entity from its parent company. In its first year, SkyCargo handled over 10,000 tonnes of freight. SkyCargo leased the entire freighter fleet from Emirates while also taking over management of the cargo holds in all of Emirates' passenger aircraft.

The airline received its first award in 1989. Since then, Emirates SkyCargo has received more than 100 international awards – including Best Cargo Airline to the Middle East for 20 years in a row.

On October 3rd, 1993, Emirates SkyCargo signed an agreement with EC International to handle all cargo shipments from the United States to 24 countries serviced by Emirates – the Middle East, Indian sub-continent, Europe and the Far East. 
New routes were launched when both Emirates began growing. Amsterdam was launched in 1997, the same year EmiratesSkyCargo was experiencing growth, and accounting for 16% of The Emirates Groups revenue.

Development since the 2000s
In May 2003, the airline took delivery of a Boeing 747-400 freighter taking the freighter fleet to three Boeing 747s. Emirates SkyCargo was operating two Boeing 747-400s with capacity for 120 tonnes and a Boeing 747-200 with capacity for 110 tonnes. 
In September 2004, the airline launched freighter services to Johannesburg and Lahore. On November 20th, 2005, Emirates announced orders for eight Boeing 777 Freighters, with the first aircraft scheduled for delivery in 2007, at the Dubai Airshow.

In 2005, Emirates SkyCargo and Korean Air Cargo signed an agreement to codeshare cargo capacity on two routes from India – Delhi and Mumbai.

In the financial year ending March 2006, SkyCargo announced revenues of over $1 billion and carried over one million tonnes of cargo. The freighter fleet included four freighters: one Boeing 747-400F and three A310-300Fs. In the same year, the airline also launched a freighter service to Barcelona using the Airbus 310 Freighter.

During the Farnborough Air Show in July 2006, Emirates signed a Heads of Agreement for ten Boeing 747-8F aircraft, to be powered by General Electric's GEnx jet engines, in a deal worth US$3.3 billion. In July 2008, EK sold these ten frames to Dubai Aerospace Enterprises and agreed to lease them back.

In 2008, Emirates SkyCargo moved its operations into its new Cargo Mega Terminal, built on a 43,600 square metre site, has increased the ground-handling capacity by 1.2 million tonnes per year. The new addition increases DXB's throughput capacity to 1.6 million tons a year.

In March 2009, SkyCargo took delivery of a new Boeing 777 long-range freighter, bringing its total fleet to eight aircraft.

In the financial year 2008-09, Emirates SkyCargo handled 1.4 million tonnes of freight, which was a 9.8 per cent increase over the previous year. The division produced revenues of AED6.7bn in 2007-8. Emirates SkyCargo generated 19 per cent of the Emirates Group's total revenues, which increased 9.9 per cent to AED44.2bn despite an 82 per cent fall in its net profits, to AED982m. The SkyCargo service alone employed over 1,000 people as of 2009.

During the financial year 2008-09, Emirates SkyCargo carried in 1,408,300 tonnes of cargo, an improvement of 9.8% compared to the previous year. Emirates SkyCargo accounts for 20% of Emirates’ transport revenue.

In November 2011, DAE cancelled five of the 747-8 freighters and converted them to 777 Freighters. In December 2012, DAE cancelled the remaining five 747-8F, with Emirates SkyCargo focusing its fleet on the 777F only.

In April 2013, SkyCargo was voted Air Cargo News Cargo Airline of the Year.

In July 2013, work started on a SkyCargo terminal. Once complete, SkyCargo will move their freighter operations from Dubai International Airport to the new facility at Dubai World Central - Al Maktoum International Airport. The facility is being built by Amana Contracting and Steel Buildings.

In May 2015, Emirates SkyCargo became the largest air freight carriers in the world to ban the transport of lion, tiger, rhino and elephant hunting trophies, even if they were obtained legally.

On April 1st, 2020, Emirates SkyCargo transferred their cargo handing operations from Emirates SkyCentral DWC to Dubai International Airport, as to modernize the operations between freighter flights and the new cargo flights.

On June 24th, 2020, Emirates has introduced additional cargo capacity by using 14 Boeing 777-300ER aircraft with their seats removed from the economy class cabin. 

On June 30th, 2020, Emirates SkyCargo marked 30 years of operations in Singapore.

In November 2020, Emirates SkyCargo started to fly Emirates A380s as temporary freighters known as "Mini Freighters" to help combat the additional cargo freight needed with countries experiencing second waves of COVID-19. These will join the Emirates 777-300ER that have already been converted to cargo flights. An A380 has around 50 tonnes of cargo space per flight in the cargo hold in belly of the plane this is just under 50% the amount of cargo a 777F can carry.

In November 2021, Emirates announced an order for an additional pair of 777F from Boeing at the 2021 Dubai Airshow. This will join the current 10 fleet of 777F and relieve some of the converted freighters.

On November 8th, 2022, Emirates SkyCargo announced a firm order for five Boeing 777F freighter aircraft, with 2 aircraft to be delivered in 2024, and the remaining 3 in 2025.

Business figures

Destinations

As of June 2020, Emirates SkyCargo operates dedicated cargo flights to 26 destinations and additionally has access to cargo capacity on further 61 Emirates passenger routes.

Fleet

Current fleet

As of November 2022, the Emirates SkyCargo fleet consists of the following aircraft:

Former fleet

The airline previously operated the following aircraft:

Notes
The Emirates Group does not publish figures separately for Emirates SkyCargo or Emirates; both of the companies' financial results are totaled together.

References

External links

The Emirates Group
Emirates Media Centre

SkyCargo
Cargo airlines of the United Arab Emirates
Airlines of the United Arab Emirates